Individual portraits of 53 people central to the history of the United States are depicted on the country's banknotes including presidents, cabinet members, members of Congress, Founding Fathers, jurists, and military leaders. 
The Secretary of the Treasury was given broad latitude by Congress in 1862 to supervise the design, printing, and issue of banknotes. The Secretary, with input from the Bureau of Engraving and Printing, has final approval over the design of banknotes.

The redesign of U.S. banknotes in 1922 prompted the Treasury Department to review the portraits on banknotes and conclude that "portraits of Presidents of the United States have a more permanent familiarity in the minds of the public than any others." Exceptions were made for Alexander Hamilton, Salmon Chase, and Benjamin Franklin. There have been no changes in the people depicted on currency intended for the general public since 1928; when Woodrow Wilson was depicted on the 1934 $100,000 gold certificate, the note was only for internal Treasury and Federal Reserve Bank use.

Five people have been depicted on U.S. currency during their lifetime, with each of those depictions occurring during the American Civil War. Abraham Lincoln was portrayed on the 1861 $10 Demand Note; Salmon Chase, Lincoln's Secretary of the Treasury, approved his own portrait for the 1862 $1 Legal Tender Note; Winfield Scott was depicted on Interest Bearing Notes during the early 1860s; and Francis Spinner and Spencer Clark both approved the use of their own image on fractional currency. In 1873, driven in large part by the actions of Spinner and Clark, Congress prohibited the use of portraits of living people on any U.S. bond, security, note, or fractional or postal currency.

Key to banknote type abbreviations
Many of the 53 individuals were depicted on more than one note of a series or denomination. In the description of the banknotes, the date in parentheses indicates the individual's first appearance on a given note type and denomination. When multiple banknotes are listed, the order, though seeming random, is in accordance with the Friedberg Number, in ascending Friedberg order. The engraved portraits are from a virtual exhibit of bank notes which are part of the National Numismatic Collection at the Smithsonian Institution.

People depicted
Each of the 53 individuals depicted on U.S. banknotes (not including fractional currency) is listed alphabetically with their most commonly associated titles, positions held, or affiliations (with dates). Elected and appointed government positions are fairly comprehensive and positions are presented in ascending chronological order.

Summary of titles/positions
Below is a summary of the titles/positions held, at one time or another, by the 53 individuals depicted on United States banknotes from 1861 to the present. The list of positions is not exhaustive, but does address the central elected federal and state officials, members of the president's cabinet, military figureheads, and several of the founders and framers of the United States government.

Fifty-three people held at least 132 elected and appointed positions for a cumulative total of over 763 years of public service.

References

Footnotes

Notes

Bibliography

 Eicher, John H. and David J. (2001). Civil War High Commands Stanford, CA, Stanford University Press. .
 Friedberg, Arthur L. and Ira S. (2010). Paper Money of the United States, 19th Edition. Clifton, NJ, The Coin & Currency Institute, Inc. .
 Heitman, Francis B. (1914). Historical Register of Officers of the Continental Army During The War of the Revolution.  Washington, DC, The Rare Book Shop Publishing Company, Inc.
 Sobel, Robert, (ed.) (1990). Biographical Directory of the United States Executive Branch 1774–1989. Westport, CT, Greenwood Press. .

External links
 Who is the only President to appear on U.S. currency while still alive?
 The National Currency Foundation

People
United States
Smithsonian Institution
People on banknotes
United States banknotes, People
United States banknotes